Boris Fyodorovich Andreyev (– 25 April 1982) was a Soviet and Russian actor. He appeared in 51 films between 1939 and 1982. People's Artist of the USSR (1962). Andreev won Stalin Prizes for Pyryev’s Ballad of Siberia (1946) and 
The Fall of Berlin (1950).

Biography
Boris Andreyev was born 9 February 1915 in Saratov, Russian Empire to a family of workers. His childhood and youth years were spent in Atkarsk, Saratov Governorate. After completing the seventh grade at school, Andreyev went to work as a mechanic-electrician at a сombine factory, where he started going to a local theatrical circle. There he was noticed by a famous Saratov actor, Ivan Slonov, who suggested that he enter the Saratov Theatre Technical School, from which Boris Andreyev successfully graduated in 1937.

For a while, Boris Andreyev played on the Saratov Drama Theater's stage. During the theater tour in Moscow, film director Ivan Pyryev offered him the role of Nazar Duma in Tractor Drivers (1939). It became his first film role and also brought him great popularity in the medium.

His next notable role was as Khariton Balun in A Great Life (1st part in 1939, 2nd part in 1958).

During the Second World War, Andreyev with Mark Bernes acted in the legendary Soviet film Two Soldiers (1943).

In the role of Ilya Zhurbin in A Big Family (1954), Andreyev demonstrated his ability to play psychologically-complicated characters. His roles in Cruelty (1959) and The Road to Berlin (1962) brought forth two of his most intense performances. The role of Vozhak in the film An Optimistic Tragedy became one of the defining performances of his career and one of its major highlights. 
 
In the 1971–1973 years, Boris Andreyev served as the narrator of several documentaries, such as People's Artist Andreyev, People's Artist Kasymov and People's Artist Shukur Burkhanov. 

Andreyev died on 25 April 1982 in Moscow, and was buried at Vagankovo Cemetery in Moscow.

Filmography

References

External links
 
 
 

1915 births
1982 deaths
20th-century Russian male actors
Cannes Film Festival Award for Best Actor winners
Communist Party of the Soviet Union members
People's Artists of the RSFSR
People's Artists of the USSR
Stalin Prize winners
Recipients of the Order of Lenin
Recipients of the Order of the Red Star
Russian male film actors
Russian male voice actors
Soviet male film actors
Soviet male voice actors
Burials at Vagankovo Cemetery